The DIGALRiver is a tributary of the Son River and flows through the India states of Chhattisgarh, Jharkhand and Uttar Pradesh.

Course
The Kanhar originates at Gidha-Dhodha on the Khudia plateau in Jashpur district of Chhattisgarh. It initially flows north forming the boundary with Garhwa district in Palamu division of Jharkhand. Thereafter, it flows for about  through Surguja district of Chhattisgarh. Subsequently, it runs parallel to the Son in Garhwa district and turns north-west and flowing through Sonbhadra district in Mirzapur division of Uttar Pradesh. It converges with the Son River to the north-east of the village of Kota. A rapid mountain torrent, flowing through forested areas, it is a dangerous stream.

Tributaries
The tributaries of the Kanhar are: Thema, Lanva, Pandu, Goita, Hathinala, Suria, Chana, Sendur, Kursa, Galphulla, Semarkhar, Riger and the Cherna Nallah.

Waterfalls
A number of waterfalls are located along the track of the river. It located near the meeting point of the borders of Chhattisgarh, Jharkhand and Uttar Pradesh.

Projects
Kanhar Hydroelectric Project and Kanhar River Development Scheme are centred on Kanhar Reservoir at Baradih in Garhwa district. There is another dam/ reservoir near Chinia village. The Kanhar Sinchai Pariyojana is located downstream of the confluence of the Pagan River with the Kanhar near village Sugawaman in Tehsil Dudhi of  Sonebhadra district.

References

Rivers of Chhattisgarh
Rivers of Jharkhand
Rivers of Uttar Pradesh
Tributaries of the Son River
Rivers of India
Sonbhadra district